Ofir Dayan (born 12 March 2000) is an Israeli group rhythmic gymnast. She will represent Israel at the 2020 Summer Olympics.

Career
Dayan competed at the 2015 Junior European Championships where she won bronze in the group all-around.

She competed at the 2018 World Championships, where team Israel finished in 15th in the group all-around. She competed at 2019 World Championships, where team Israel finished in sixth in the group all-around.

Dayan competed at the 2020 European Championships where she won a gold medal in the group all-around, and silver in 5 balls and the team competition. She competed at the 2021 European Championships where she won a gold medal in the 3 hoops + 4 clubs and bronze medals in the 5 balls, group all-around and team competitions.

Dayan will represent Israel at the 2020 Summer Olympics, alongside Yana Kramarenko, Natalie Raits, Yuliana Telegina and Karin Vexman.

References

External links
 
 

2000 births
Living people
Israeli rhythmic gymnasts
Medalists at the Rhythmic Gymnastics European Championships
Israeli people of Jewish descent
Gymnasts at the 2020 Summer Olympics
Olympic gymnasts of Israel